Inez De Coninck (born 10 August 1977) is a Belgian politician from Flemish Brabant region and a member of the New Flemish Alliance (N-VA).

De Coninck worked as an architect and a spatial planner. She was a co-founder of the Flemish Women's Association and became involved with the local N-VA branch in her hometown of Opwijk. She was elected to the municipal in the town in 2012. In 2019, she was elected to the Flemish Parliament and became mayor of Opwijk in 2021.

References

1977 births
Living people
Members of the Flemish Parliament
New Flemish Alliance politicians
21st-century Belgian women politicians
21st-century Belgian politicians